Jorge Devesa García (born 18 June 1988 in Alcoy, Alcoià, Valencian Community) is a Spanish footballer who plays for UD Ibiza mainly as a right back.

References

External links

1988 births
Living people
People from Alcoià
Sportspeople from the Province of Alicante
Spanish footballers
Footballers from the Valencian Community
Association football defenders
Segunda División players
Segunda División B players
Tercera División players
Hércules CF B players
CD Alcoyano footballers
UE Cornellà players